Walter Borck (1 May 1891 – 5 January 1949) was a German international footballer.

References

1891 births
1949 deaths
Association football goalkeepers
German footballers
Germany international footballers